Khalilur Rahman Chowdhury, also known as Rafi, is a Bangladeshi politician and the former Member of Parliament of Habiganj-1.

Career
Chowdhury was the former joint secretary general of the Jatiya Party and the district president of Habiganj. He then joined the Bangladesh Nationalist Party. He was elected to parliament from Habiganj-1 as a Jatiya Party candidate in 1991. He lost the seventh national election in June 1996 from the same seat.

Death 
Khalilur Rahman Chowdhury died on June 22, 2013.

References 

Jatiya Party politicians
Year of birth missing
5th Jatiya Sangsad members
People from Nabiganj Upazila
2013 deaths
Bangladesh Nationalist Party politicians